Christopher Watson Grady (born November 28, 1962) is a United States Navy admiral who serves as the 12th vice chairman of the Joint Chiefs of Staff since December 20, 2021. He most recently served as the commander of United States Fleet Forces Command and United States Naval Forces Northern Command from May 2018 to December 2021, with additional duties as commander of United States Naval Forces Strategic Command and Joint Force Maritime Component Commander from February 2019. He previously served as commander of the United States Sixth Fleet, commander of Naval Striking and Support Forces NATO, deputy commander of United States Naval Forces Europe - Naval Forces Africa and Joint Force Maritime Component Commander Europe from October 2016 to March 2018.

A 1984 graduate of the University of Notre Dame, Grady was commissioned into the Navy via the Naval Reserve Officers' Training Corps program. Grady is currently the Navy's "Old Salt", designating the longest-serving surface warfare officer on active duty in the U.S. Navy, having received the title and accompanying trophy from Admiral Philip S. Davidson on April 30, 2021.

Naval career

Christopher Grady was born in Portsmouth, Virginia and raised in Newport, Rhode Island. He is a graduate of the University of Notre Dame, and was commissioned an ensign in the United States Navy through the Naval Reserve Officers Training Corps program in 1984. Grady is a distinguished graduate of Georgetown University, where he earned a Master of Arts in National Security Studies while concurrently participating as a fellow in Foreign Service at the Edmund A. Walsh School of Foreign Service. He is also a distinguished graduate of the National War College, earning a Master of Science in National Security Affairs.

Grady's initial sea tour was aboard USS Moosbrugger (DD 980), where he served as combat information center officer and anti-submarine warfare officer. Grady then commanded  deploying as part of NATO's Standing Naval Forces Mediterranean. He then commanded Destroyer Squadron 22, deploying to the Persian Gulf as sea combat commander for the Theodore Roosevelt Carrier Strike Group (TRCSG) in support of Operations Enduring Freedom and Iraqi Freedom.

Ashore, Grady first served on the staff of the Joint Chiefs of Staff and then as naval aide to the chief of naval operations. He also served on the staff of the chief of naval operations as assistant branch head, Europe and Eurasia Politico-Military Affairs Branch (OPNAV N524). He then served as executive assistant to the navy's Chief of Legislative Affairs. Next, he served as the deputy executive secretary of the National Security Council in the White House. He then went on to serve as the executive assistant to the chief of naval operations.

Grady's flag assignments include the Director of the Maritime Operations Center (N2/3/5/7), commander, United States Pacific Fleet; Commander, Carrier Strike Group 1 and the Carl Vinson Carrier Strike Group, where he deployed for nearly ten months to the Western Pacific and the Persian Gulf conducting combat operations in support of Operation Inherent Resolve. He was then commander of Naval Surface Force Atlantic.

As a vice admiral, he commanded the United States Sixth Fleet from October 28, 2016 to March 1, 2018, relinquishing command to Vice Admiral Lisa Franchetti. On October 31, 2017, the United States Senate confirmed Grady's reappointment to the rank of vice admiral and assignment as the assistant to the Chairman of the Joint Chiefs of Staff.

On February 28, 2018, Grady was nominated by President Donald Trump for appointment to the rank of admiral and assignment as commander of United States Fleet Forces Command, and confirmed by the Senate on March 22, 2018. He assumed command of USFFC and Naval Forces Northern Command on May 4, 2018 and of commander, Naval Forces Strategic Command (NAVSTRAT) and United States Strategic Command Joint Force Maritime Component Command (JFMCC) on February 1, 2019.

Vice Chairman of the Joint Chiefs of Staff 

On November 1, 2021, he was nominated by President Joe Biden to succeed retiring General John E. Hyten as the vice chairman of the Joint Chiefs of Staff. A nomination hearing was scheduled for December 2, 2021, but it was postponed in favor of Senate negotiations on the 2022 NDAA. He was confirmed by voice vote on December 16, 2021, and was sworn in on December 20, 2021.

Awards and decorations

In addition to the below, the University of Notre Dame Alumni Board presented Grady with the Rev. William Corby, C.S.C., Award on September 28, 2019. Established in 1985, the award is conferred on alumni who have distinguished themselves in military service.

 Surface Navy Association's "Old Salt" Award

References

|-

1962 births
Living people
People from Portsmouth, Virginia
People from Newport, Rhode Island
University of Notre Dame alumni
Georgetown University alumni
National War College alumni
Recipients of the Meritorious Service Medal (United States)
Recipients of the Legion of Merit
United States Navy admirals
Recipients of the Defense Superior Service Medal
Recipients of the Navy Distinguished Service Medal
Vice Chairmen of the Joint Chiefs of Staff